The 1960 United States presidential election in New Hampshire took place on November 8, 1960, as part of the 1960 United States presidential election, which was held throughout all 50 states. Voters chose four representatives, or electors to the Electoral College, who voted for president and vice president.

New Hampshire was won by the Republican nominees, incumbent Vice President Richard Nixon of California, and his running mate  Ambassador Henry Cabot Lodge, Jr. of Massachusetts. Nixon and Lodge defeated the Democratic nominees, Senator John F. Kennedy of Massachusetts and his running mate Senate Majority Leader Lyndon B. Johnson of Texas.

Nixon took 53.42% of the vote to Kennedy's 46.58%, a margin of 6.84%.

Kennedy swept the entire Northeastern United States, with the exception of the three Upper New England states, although Kennedy was much stronger in New Hampshire and the result was much closer than in neighboring Vermont and Maine.

Although the statewide result was close, Nixon won seven of the state's counties while Kennedy won three.

Since Franklin Roosevelt won them in 1932, the counties of Hillsborough County, Strafford County, and Coos County had become reliable New Deal Democratic base counties, voting for Roosevelt all four times as well as for Harry S. Truman. The counties had been won back by the GOP when Dwight Eisenhower swept the state in his nationwide landslide of 1956. However, they reverted to the Democratic Party in 1960, allowing Kennedy to take nearly 47% statewide compared to the 34% Adlai Stevenson had received in the state in 1956.

Kennedy's most substantial victory was in heavily populated Hillsborough County, home to Manchester and Nashua, which went to Kennedy by a decisive 58–42 margin.

Carroll County had long been the most Republican county in New Hampshire, voting over eighty percent Republican in 1952 and 1956, and in 1960 it would remains Nixon's strongest county in the region, with Nixon taking over 79% of the vote.

As Kennedy narrowly edged out Nixon to win the 1960 election nationally, New Hampshire's results would make the state 7% more Republican than the national average.

Nixon would later win New Hampshire again in both 1968 and 1972.

Primaries

Both the Republican and Democratic parties held primaries on March 8.

Democratic primary

Kennedy had flirted with the New Hampshire primary once before. In 1956 he had briefly considered running as a New England favorite son, with the aim of unifying the state's delegation behind Adlai Stevenson II.

At the start of 1957, Kennedy staffer Ted Sorensen reached out to Bernard L. Boutin (mayor of Laconia, and New Hampshire's representative to the Democratic National Committee) and arranged a meeting between him and Kennedy. Kennedy informed Boutin that he was very seriously exploring a presidential campaign for 1960 and managed to secure his support.

In the following years, money from the Kennedy campaign flowed into the state and Kennedy and his allies continued to visit the state. New Hampshire and a reputation as a state which rewarded campaigning efforts. This meant that Kennedy's status as a native of a neighboring state would not, alone, give him much of an advantage.

In 1958, Kennedy and several members of his family conducted visits to the state. His mother Rose spoke at several colleges and even attended a Concord Bar Mitzvah. His brother Ted gave a speech in rudimentary French to a French-speaking crowd in Suncook. His sisters Eunice, Jean, and Patricia also appeared in the state.

Other potential candidates, such as Lyndon B. Johnson, Stuart Symington, and Hubert Humphrey also made exploratory visits to the state. However, Boutin had established a comprehensive support network for Kennedy in the state which proved strong enough to ward off these candidates.

3 fringe candidates stepped forth to run in the primary. These were Lawrence Daly and country music singer Elton Britt, and ballpoint pen manufacturer Paul Fischer. Boutin managed to successfully challenge the validity of signatures on Daly and Britt's candidature petitions, quickly quashing their candidacies. Paul C. Fisher, who was running on radical tax reform, remained Kennedy's only challenger on the ballot.

Ahead of the primary local Republicans attacked Kennedy, including Governor Wesley Powell, and the New Hampshire Union Leader ran fiercely negative coverage. Nevertheless, Kennedy won handily.

Republican primary

Nixon faced no opponents on the ballot, but several individuals did receive write-in votes.

General election

Results

Results by county

See also
 Presidency of John F. Kennedy
 Presidency of Lyndon B. Johnson
 United States presidential elections in New Hampshire

References

1960
New Hamp
1960 New Hampshire elections